Kiptum, sometimes Kitum, is a surname of Kenyan origin meaning "someone born during a ceremony" Among the Nandi community, "Tum" is defined as a ceremony, therefore 'Kiptum' is a male name for someone born during a ceremony while 'Cheptum' is a female name for the same. Other variation include 'Kitum' and the name has been used in the following context:

Fred Kiprop Kiptum (born 1974), Kenyan marathon runner and 1999 Amsterdam Marathon winner
Jeruto Kiptum (born 1981), Kenyan steeplechase runner and 2005 World Championships medallist
Julius Kiptum Rop (born 1977), Kenyan marathon runner
Timothy Kitum (born 1994), Kenyan middle-distance runner and 2012 Olympic medallist